Aaron Sprinkle (born March 20, 1974) is an American singer, songwriter and record producer from Seattle, Washington.

Career
His career in music began in high school with a group called BellBangVilla.  BellBangVilla became Poor Old Lu and they released a number of albums (see below). Aaron Sprinkle also sang and played lead guitar in Rose Blossom Punch, and has produced albums independently. On his solo releases, he plays almost all instruments except drums. He produced dozens of records for Tooth & Nail Records between 1993 and 2016. In 2005, Sprinkle formed the band Fair with Joey Sanchez, Nick Barber, and Erick Newbill. Fair released its debut album The Best Worst-Case Scenario on Tooth & Nail Records in June 2006. He is the brother of drummer Jesse Sprinkle. Jesse played with Aaron in Poor Old Lu, and was also an early member of Demon Hunter, whose albums Aaron has produced the majority of.

Discography

With Poor Old Lu (1990–2002)
 In Love with the Greenery (As BellBangVilla) (1990)
 Three Song Demo (Cassette only) (1991)
 Star-Studded-Super-Step (1992, 1995 & 1998)
 Mindsize (1993)
 Split 7″ with Mortal (1993)
 Sin (1994)
 Straight Six (1995)
 A Picture of the Eighth Wonder (1996)
 In Their Final Performance (1998)
 Chrono [1993-1998] (1998)
 The Waiting Room (2002)

With Rose Blossom Punch (1997–1999)
 Ephemere (1997)
 So Sorry to Disappoint You (1999)
 Par Avion 7″ vinyl

Solo (1999–present)
 Moontraveler (1999)
 The Kindest Days (2000)
 Really Something EP (2001)
 Bareface (2001)
 Live: The Boy Who Stopped the World (2003)
 Lackluster - Best Of (2004)
 Water & Guns (2013)
 Real Life (2017)
 Escaping Light (2018)
 Instrumentals, Vol. 1: Alexandria (2018)
 Instrumentals, Vol. 2: Unravel (2019)
 Instrumentals, Vol. 3: North Coast (2019)
 Instrumentals, Vol. 4: Feather Falling (2021)
 Walking Back (2021)
 Certainty (2021)

With Fair (2006–present)
 The Best Worst-Case Scenario (2006)
 "Carelessness" (CD single) (2006)
 Disappearing World (2010)

With Blank Books (2017–present)
 EP1 (2017)

Contributions

Solo
 "A Christmas Song for All Year Round" (from Happy Christmas Volume 3 – 2001, Tooth & Nail Records)
 "I Know There's an Answer (Hang On to Your Ego)" (from Making God Smile: An Artists' Tribute to the Songs of Beach Boy Brian Wilson – 2002, Silent Planet Records)

With Rose Blossom Punch
 "Sowing in the Sun" (from Artcore Vol. I – 1996, Tooth & Nail Records)
 "Based on a True Story (Demo)" (from Music for Meals: Take Time to Listen Vol. III – 1997, SaraBellum Records)
 "See It in Me" (from Artcore Vol. II – Tooth & Nail Records)

Album credits
Aaron has production, engineering, or other credits on albums by the following bands:

 Aaron Gillespie
 Producer, engineering, co-writer, and additional instruments and vocals on Anthem Song
 Acceptance
 Producer on Black Lines to Battlefields, Phantoms, and Colliding By Design
 Adie
 Producer on Don't Wait
 The Almost
 Producer and additional vocals on Southern Weather
 Producer on Monster Monster
 Anberlin
 Producer, engineering, and mixing on Blueprints for the Black Market
 Producer and engineering on Never Take Friendship Personal
 Producer on Godspeed EP and Cities
 Producer and engineering on Vital
 Vocal production and engineering on Lowborn
 Beth Orton
 Blenderhead
 Producer on Prime Candidate for Burnout
 Brooke Barrettsmith
 Producer on Brooke Barrettsmith
 Bugs in Amber
 Mixing and instruments on Rocketship Letters
 Capital Lights
 Producer of This Is an Outrage!
 Calibretto 13
 Producer on Adventures in Tokyo
 Copeland
 Co-producer of You Are My Sunshine
 Damien Jurado
 Mixer on I Break Chairs
 Dead Poetic
 Producer of New Medicines, Vices and The Finest
 Demon Hunter
 Producer on all albums (except Live in Nashville, 45 Days,  War, and Exile.)
 Co-producer, programming, and keyboards on Storm the Gates of Hell
 Co-producer on Extremist
 Keyboards on The Triptych''''
 Disciple
 Producer on Long Live the Rebels Dolour
 Co-producer of Suburbiac Eisley
 Co-producer of Marvelous Things E.P. and Room Noises Emery
 Producer on The Question and ...In Shallow Seas We Sail Additional vocals for ...In Shallow Seas We Sail Additional instruments and vocals on We Do What We Want Every Avenue
 Producer on Bad Habits Falling Up
 Producer on Crashings Co-writer and producer on Captiva FM Static
 Producer of What Are You Waiting For? Co-producer of Dear Diary and My Brain Says Stop, But My Heart Says Go! Gatsbys American Dream
 Producer of Why We Fight Grammatrain
 Producer of Lonely House Hawk Nelson
 Co-producer of Letters to the President Producer of Smile, It's the End of the World He Is We
 Producer of My Forever Hyland
 Producer of Weights & Measures Icon for Hire
 Co-producer on Scripted Ivoryline
 Producer of There Came a Lion and Vessels Jeremy Camp
 Producer and instruments on Restored Co-producer on Beyond Measure Jonezetta
 Producer of Cruel to Be Young Joy Electric
 Mixer on The Tick Tock Treasury Co-mixer on Hello, Mannequin KJ-52
 Producer on Behind the Musik (A Boy Named Jonah) Co-producer on "Dangerous" 
 Kutless
 Producer ("Kutless", "Sea of Faces", "Strong Tower", "Hearts of the Innocent", and " Surrender " 
 Co-writer of Sea of Faces Little Champions
 Audio Mixer on Pillow Mae
 Co-producer on Destination: B-Sides MxPx
 Producer of Pokinatcha and Secret Weapon The Museum
 Producer on Let Love Win New Found Glory
 Producer of Makes Me Sick (album) Nine Lashes
 Co-producer of World We View and From Water to War
 Number One Gun
 Producer of The North Pole Project and Promises for the Imperfect Pedro the Lion
 Co-writer on Control Poema
 Producer of Sing It Now Project 86
 Co-producer on Songs to Burn Your Bridges By Relient K
 Co-producer on Collapsible Lung Rocky Votolato
 Audio mixer on Makers Ruth
 Producer of Secondhand Dreaming Co-producer of Anorak The Send
 Producer, additional vocals and instruments from Cosmos Sent By Ravens
 Producer of Our Graceful Words Seven Places
 Producer of Lonely for the Last Time and Hear Us Say Jesus Seventh Day Slumber
 Producer of Once Upon a Shattered Life Sherri Youngward
 Producer of Six Inches of Sky Sometime Sunday
 Mixing and instruments on Drain Soulfood 76
 Engineering on Velour Squad Five-O
 Solo guitar on 2 tracks on Fight The System Starflyer 59
 Producer, engineering, and mixing on Old States
 Producer on "Room To Run" re-release
 Stavesacre
 Producer, engineering, and instruments on Collective Swimming With Dolphins
 Co-producer of Water Colours Time to Fly
 Producer on Birth. Work. Death The Divorce
 Engineering on The Divorce EP Thousand Foot Krutch
 Producer of the Phenomenon, Welcome to the Masquerade, The End Is Where We Begin, Oxygen: Inhale, and Exhale 
 Wes Dando
 Producer and co-engineer on The Tired Hours
 Zao
 Co-producer on Legendary

References

External links

 
 Poor Old Lu
 Fair
 Interview @ Christianity Today from early 2004
 Aaron Sprinkle on Pure Volume

1974 births
Living people
American male singer-songwriters
Record producers from Washington (state)
American performers of Christian music
Tooth & Nail Records artists
Musicians from Seattle
Singer-songwriters from Washington (state)